The Wisconsin Badgers women's ice hockey team is the hockey team that represents the University of Wisconsin in Madison, Wisconsin.

History
On October 8, 1999, the Bulldogs played the Wisconsin Badgers in the first ever Women's WCHA conference game at the Kohl Center in Madison, WI. It was the highest attended game of the season (3,892) and resulted in an 8–1 defeat of the Badgers.

In 2006, the Wisconsin Badgers became the first team outside the state of Minnesota to win the Women's Frozen Four championship. The Badgers defeated the defending champions, the Minnesota Golden Gophers, by a score of 3–0 at Mariucci Arena in Minneapolis, Minnesota.

On January 28, 2012, the Wisconsin Badgers broke the NCAA women's hockey attendance record for the third consecutive year with 12,402 fans in attendance. The game was part of a two-game sweep of the Bemidji State Beavers. The previous record for most fans to watch a women's college hockey game at the Kohl Center was 10,668. That record was set on January 29, 2011.

On November 6, 2016, Ann-Renee Desbiens achieved career shutout number 44, breaking Noora Raty’s record for most NCAA career shutouts.

An 8-2 win on December 4, 2016 against their rivals, the Minnesota Golden Gophers resulted in a career milestone. Playing in front of a sellout crowd at Labahn Arena, Sarah Nurse scored a hat trick, becoming the first player in program history to score a hat trick against Minnesota. It marked the first time that Wisconsin scored eight goals in a game since October 11, 2015 against Ohio State, as five different Badgers scored at least one goal.

On January 14, 2017 Wisconsin once again broke its own NCAA women's hockey single-game attendance record of 13,573 which was set in 2014. The Badgers defeated St. Cloud State 2-0 at their at Fill the Bowl event in front of a crowd of 15,359.

Appearing in the 2021 NCAA National Collegiate Women's Ice Hockey Tournament versus the Northeastern Huskies, Daryl Watts scored the game-winning goal in a 2-1 overtime win. With the win, the program captured its sixth national championship, all with Mark Johnson as head coach.

Season by season results

* Johnson took a one-year leave to coach the 2010 US Women's Olympic team.

Frozen Four
Wisconsin appeared in the Frozen Four championship in the following years:

Current roster
As of August 20, 2022.

Awards and honors

National honors
Women's Hockey Commissioners Association National Rookie of the Year
Annie Pankowski (2015)

Patty Kazmaier Award
Sara Bauer (2006)
Jessie Vetter (2009)
Meghan Duggan (2011)
Brianna Decker (2012)
Ann-Renée Desbiens (2017)

Bob Allen Women's Hockey Player of the Year
Jessie Vetter (2009)
Meghan Duggan (2011)
Hilary Knight (2014)
Brianna Decker (2015)
Abby Roque (2020)

WCHA honors
WCHA Player of the Year
Sara Bauer (2006, 2007)
Hilary Knight (2009)
Meghan Duggan (2011)
Brianna Decker (2012)
Ann-Renée Desbiens (2016)
Annie Pankowski (2019)
Abby Roque (2020)
Daryl Watts (2021)

WCHA Defensive Player of the Year
Molly Engstrom (2004, 2005)
Bobbi-Jo Slusar (2006)
Meaghan Mikkelson (2007)
Stefanie McKeough (2012)

WCHA Rookie of the Year
Meghan Hunter (2001)
Sara Bauer (2004)
Meghan Duggan (2007)
Annie Pankowski (2015)
Abby Roque (2017)
Sophie Shirley (2019)
Caroline Harvey (2023)

WCHA Coach of the Year
Mark Johnson (2003, 2006, 2007, 2009, 2011, 2012, 2016, 2019, 2021)

WCHA All-Star teams

Badger Award
The Badger Award is a team honor known as Most Inspirational Player award.
2000: Kerry Weiland
2001: Jen Mead
2002: Kathy Devereaux
2003: Sis Paulsen/Katie Temple
2004: Molly Engstrom
2005: Sharon Cole
2006: Sharon Cole
2007: Phoebe Monteleone
2008: Erika Lawler
2010: Genna Prough

Frozen Four All-Tournament team

All-America honors
Sarah Nurse, Second-Team All-American (2016-17)
Annie Pankowski, Second-Team All-American (2016-17)
Jenny Ryan, Second-Team All-American (2016-17)
Abby Roque: 2020 First Team All-American
Grace Bowlby, 2020-21 CCM/AHCA First Team All-American
Daryl Watts, CCM/AHCA 2020-21 First Team All-American

USCHO D-1 Women's Player of the Year
2020: Abby Roque

HCA Awards
Daryl Watts, Hockey Commissioners Association Women’s Player of the Month (March 2021):
Makenna Webster,  Hockey Commissioners Association Women’s Rookie of the Month (March 2021)
Lacey Eden, Hockey Commissioners Association Women’s Rookie of the Month (February 2021)

WCHA 20th Anniversary Team
Sarah Nurse: WCHA 20th Anniversary Team

Career records

Career Points Leaders (Top Ten All-Time Scorers)

Career Goaltending Records (Top Ten - Games Played)

Career Goaltending Records (Top Ten - Wins)

Career Goaltending Records (Top Ten - Saves)

Career Goaltending Records (Top Ten - Shutouts)

Badgers in professional hockey

Notable players
Sara Bauer – Patty Kazmaier Award winner, 2007 Big Ten Medal of Honor, 2007 NCAA Women's Frozen Four Most Outstanding Player
Brianna Decker – 2012 Patty Kazmaier Award winner, 2011 second team All-American, 2011–12 CCM Hockey Women's Division I first team All-American
Meghan Duggan – member 2010 U.S. Olympic team, 2011 Patty Kazmaier Award winner, 2011 NCAA Women's Frozen Four Most Outstanding Player, 2011 first team All-American
Molly Engstrom – member 2010 U.S. Olympic team
Angie Keseley
Hilary Knight – member 2010 U.S. Olympic team, 2010 WCHA Pre-Season Player of the Year, 2011 NCAA Women's Frozen Four Most Outstanding Player, 2011 first team All-American
Erika Lawler – member 2010 U.S. Olympic team
Carla MacLeod – member 2010 Canadian Olympic team, 2007 Wisconsin Badgers Big Ten Medal of Honor
Meaghan Mikkelson – member 2010 Canadian Olympic team
Jessica Ring – 2006 Big Ten Medal of Honor
Becca Ruegsegger, 2011 NCAA Elite 88 Award
Jessie Vetter – member 2010 U.S. Olympic team, 2009 Bob Allen Women's Ice Hockey Player of the Year, 2009 Patty Kazmaier Award, 2006, 2009 NCAA Women's Frozen Four Most Outstanding Player
Kerry Weiland – member 2010 U.S. Olympic team
Jinelle Zaugg-Siergiej – member 2010 U.S. Olympic team

References

External links

 
Ice hockey teams in Wisconsin
1999 establishments in Wisconsin
Ice hockey clubs established in 1999